Tom Jordan (born 18 September 1998) is a New Zealand rugby union player. He plays for Glasgow Warriors in the United Rugby Championship. Jordan can play at Fly half or Centre. He previously played for Ayrshire Bulls.

Rugby Union career

Amateur career

Jordan played for Hamilton Old Boys in New Zealand.

Professional career

Jordan was signed by the Ayrshire Bulls to play in the Super 6 league in 2019. He was player of the match in the 2021 Super 6 final contributing 16 points to Ayrshire Bulls title victory over the Southern Knights.

Having impressed in the Super 6, he was signed by Glasgow Warriors in November 2021. He played in the pre-season friendly against his old team, the Ayrshire Bulls, in Inverness on 2 September 2022, playing at Centre.

He made his competitive debut in the United Rugby Championship playing against Benetton Rugby in Italy on 16 September 2022 at Fly-half. He has the Glasgow Warrior No. 343.

He made his competitive home debut at Scotstoun Stadium in Glasgow's 52 - 24 win over Cardiff Rugby.

References

1998 births
Living people
Glasgow Warriors players
Rugby union fly-halves
Ayr RFC players
New Zealand rugby union players
Rugby union centres